Hell or High Water may refer to:

Film and television
 Hell or High Water (film), a 2016 American film
 "Hell or High Water" (Prison Break), an episode of Prison Break

Music

Artists
 Hell or Highwater, the side-project of Atreyu's drummer, Brandon Saller

Albums
 Come Hell or High Water, a 1993 live album by Deep Purple
 Hell or High Water (Tinsley Ellis album), 2002
 Hell or High Water (As Cities Burn album), 2009
 Hell or Highwater (album), by David Duchovny, 2015

EPs
 The Hell or High Water EP, by The Red Jumpsuit Apparatus, 2010

Songs
 "Hell or High Water", a song by AC/DC from the 1985 album Fly on the Wall
 "Hell or High Water", a song by Kiss from the 1987 album Crazy Nights
 "Hell or High Water", a song by Quiet Riot from the 1995 album Down to the Bone
 "Hell, or High Water", a song by Woe, Is Me from the 2010 album Number[s]
 "Hell or High Water", a song by Passenger from the 2018 album Runaway

Other uses
 Hell or high water clause, a contract clause

See also

 Hell and High Water (disambiguation)
 Come Hell or High Water, a 1994 album by Deep Purple
 Come Hell or High Water (The Flowers of Hell album), 2009